(We thank you, God, we thank you), 29, is a sacred cantata by Johann Sebastian Bach. The cantata text by an unknown author includes in movement 2 the beginning of Psalm 75, and as the closing chorale the fifth stanza of Johann Gramann's "". Bach scored the work in eight movements for four vocal parts and a festive Baroque orchestra of three trumpets, timpani, two oboes, strings, an obbligato organ and basso continuo. The organ dominates the first movement Sinfonia which Bach derived from a Partita for violin. The full orchestra accompanies the first choral movement and plays with the voices in the closing chorale, while a sequence of three arias alternating with two recitatives is scored intimately.

History and words 
 
It was not a democratic election, but a "ceremonial transfer of office" of council members who were appointed. The service was not part of the liturgical year with cantata texts related to prescribed biblical epistle and gospel readings. For the same occasion, Bach had already written the cantata , in his first year in Leipzig, 1723. For the Ratswechsel service, he could count on the entire council (his employer) listening, probably also civil servants and representatives of the Elector's administration for the region. The musicologist Klaus Hofmann notes: "It was an opportunity for Bach to show how sacred music was flourishing under his direction and to present himself as a composer."

The cantata text of Wir danken dir, Gott by an unknown author includes in movement 2 the first verse of Psalm 75 and as the closing chorale the fifth stanza of Johann Gramann's hymn of praise "" (1540).

Bach first performed the cantata on 27 August 1731. According to Hofmann, the movement is based on an earlier lost composition.

Bach performed the cantata for Ratswechsel at least two more times, on 31 August 1739 and on 24 August 1749.

Scoring and structure 
The cantata is structured in eight movements and takes about 28 minutes to perform. The instrumentation reflects the festive occasion for which it was written. Bach scored the work for four vocal soloists (soprano (S), alto (A), tenor (T) and bass) (B), a four-part choir, and a Baroque orchestra of three trumpets (Tr), timpani (Ti), two oboes (Ob), two violins (Vl) (violin solo in movement 3), violas (Va), an obbligato organ (Org) and basso continuo (Bc). The autograph score is titled: "Bey der Rahts-Wahl / 1731. / Wir dancken dir, Gott, wir dancken dir. / à / 4 Voci. / 3 Trombe / Tamburi / 2 Hautbois / 2 Violini / Viola / e / Continuo / con Organo obligato / di / Joh.Seb:Bach.

In the following table of the movements, the scoring follows the Neue Bach-Ausgabe, and the abbreviations for voices and instruments the list of Bach cantatas. The time signature is provided using the symbol for common time (4/4). The timpani are listed with the trumpets because they always play together.

Music

1 

The cantata is one of few sacred Bach cantatas opened by an orchestral sinfonia. Another is the early . The music is an arrangement of the prelude from Bach's Partita for violin, BWV 1006, which Bach had already revised for organ and strings in 1729 for the wedding cantata . In the cantata for Ratswechsel, the solo organ plays the original violin part "in virtuoso motoric writing", while the full orchestra adds an accompaniment.

2 
The first vocal movement is a setting of verse 1 of Psalm 75, "", translated in the King James version of the bible as "Unto thee, O God, do we give thanks, unto thee do we give thanks: for that thy name is near thy wondrous works declare". In contrast to the virtuoso introduction, the chorus begins in motet style in grave stile antico. The bass begins in great simplicity a theme in even steps; the tenor starts imitating almost immediately, the alto a little later, then the soprano. In the beginning only oboes and strings play  with the voices, then a trumpet doubles the soprano. Developing further, two trumpets take part in the polyphony, and a climax is reached when the third trumpet and timpani enter. Hofmann comments that although the movement begins in old style, "Bach’s method of intensification (by means of which he gradually introduces trumpets and ultimately allows the theme to be heard in stretta) is thoroughly baroque.

3 
"" (Alleluia, strength and power) is set as an aria for tenor. The voice, a solo violin and the continuo are equal partners.

4 
A recitative for bass, "" (Praise God! It is well for us!) mentions that God "holds his hand protectively and in blessing above the city".

5 
The soprano aria is a prayer, "" (Consider us with Your love)‘’ (‘Think of us with your love’) for "God’s future providence", described by Hofmann as "a musical display piece full of warmth and tenderness in a rocking siciliano rhythm. For long stretches in the vocal sections, Bach does without a continuo accompaniment (thus without the instrumental bass register) – a tactic that effectively contributes to creating a sonic impression of tenderness and charm".

6 
A recitative for alto is a prayer for future protection, "" (Do not forget later, with Your hand), concluded by a choral Amen in unison. (And all the people shall answer and say, Amen.).

7 
The alto performs the last aria, "" (Hallelujah, power and might)‘’, repeating and reinforcing the thoughts of the first. The music repeats the main section of the tenor aria, now accompanied by the organ. This close connection within the structure of the work of both the theme (3 and 6) and the instrument (1 and 6) is unusual in Bach's cantatas.

8 
In the closing chorale, "" (Glory, and praise with honor) the trumpets accentuate the ends of some lines of the fifth verse of Johann Gramann's "".

Recordings 
The entries of the following table are taken from the Bach Cantatas Website.

References

Bibliography 
Scores
 
 

Books
 
 

Online sources

Several databases provide additional information on each cantata, such as history, scoring, sources for text and music, translations to various languages, discography, discussion and musical analysis.

The complete recordings of Bach's cantatas are accompanied by liner notes from musicians and musicologists: Klaus Hofmann wrote for Masaaki Suzuki, and Christoph Wolff for Ton Koopman.

External links 
Wir danken dir, Gott, wir danken dir, BWV 29: performance by the Netherlands Bach Society (video and background information)

Council cantatas by Johann Sebastian Bach
Psalm-related compositions by Johann Sebastian Bach
1731 compositions